Ari Palolahti (born 9 September 1968 in Rovaniemi) is a Finnish cross-country skier. He represented Finland at the 2002 Winter Olympics in Salt Lake City, where he competed in the 15 km and in the sprint.

Cross-country skiing results
All results are sourced from the International Ski Federation (FIS).

Olympic Games

World Championships

World Cup

Season standings

Individual podiums
1 victory 
3 podiums

Team podiums

 1 victory – (1 ) 
 24 podiums – (2 , 2 )

References

External links

1968 births
Living people
Finnish male cross-country skiers
Cross-country skiers at the 2002 Winter Olympics
Olympic cross-country skiers of Finland
People from Rovaniemi
Sportspeople from Lapland (Finland)
21st-century Finnish people